Myriam Boyer (born 23 May 1948) is a French actress. She appeared in more than eighty films and television shows since 1970. At the age of 18, she married  with whom she had a son, Clovis Cornillac. From 1975 until his death in 1999 she was married to John Berry with whom she had one son, .

Filmography

Theater

References

External links 
 

1948 births
Living people
French film actresses
Actresses from Lyon
French television actresses